Pietro Marchesini (April 7, 1692 - October 24, 1757) was an Italian painter of the Baroque period, active in Tuscany.

Biography
He was born in Pistoia. He was patronized by Lorenzo Maria Gianni, and studied with Anton Domenico Gabbiani in Florence. For the Gianni family, he often traveled to create a number of copies of originals of Titian, Veronese, Raphael, Carracci, and Andrea del Sarto. His travels gave his paintings a venetian coloring. He painted a Santa Margherita for the church of the Ognissanti in Florence; a St Thomas for the church of San Lorenzo. He also painted in Pistoia and the church of Valdibure.

References

1692 births
1757 deaths
People from Pistoia
18th-century Italian painters
Italian male painters
Italian Baroque painters
Painters from Tuscany
18th-century Italian male artists